Sennelier is a French manufacturing company of art materials, mostly famous for its hand selected pigments. The company produces a wide range of paint products, including acrylic, oil, watercolor, gouache, oil and soft pastel, india ink, tempera, and other media.

History
Gustave Sennelier opened this art supply store in 1887, near the famous Ecole des Beaux-Arts. Initially, Sennelier sold paints made by various manufacturers; later he chose to produce his own paints using local pigments and binders procured from his travels across Europe.

Anecdotally, it is believed that Sennelier gained prominence at this time.  Art-supply shops were ubiquitous, and Cézanne, Gauguin, and many other artists would shop around in the neighborhood, in search of particular shades of paint.  If Gustave Sennelier didn't stock the color, he would create it for his painters.

In 1949, Henri Sennelier, Gustave's son, created the first professional-quality oil pastel for Pablo Picasso. Picasso wanted colors he could use on any surface, without any special preparation. In addition to the aforementioned Cézanne, Gauguin, and Picasso, Vincent van Gogh was also known to have used Sennelier oil paint.

Sennelier is one of just a few companies that still provides dry pigments for sale. Most artists today simply buy ready-mixed paints. The range of dry pure pigments offered by the company is quite large, exceeding eighty colors. The artist can then mix the colors into the preferred medium, creating a range of possibilities.
Sennnelier has a website that explains more about these techniques, supported by a number of videos demonstrating the use of the products. It is in French, but allows the user to choose an English translation.

References

External links
 
 L'expérience d'un artisan de la couleur de l'art

Art materials brands
French brands
Oil paint brands
Watercolor brands
Gouache brands
Artists' acrylic paint brands
Ink brands
Manufacturing companies of France
Manufacturing companies established in 1887